Khamiran (also Romanized as Khamīrān; also known as Khamīrūn and Khemeru) is a village in Var Posht Rural District, in the Central District of Tiran and Karvan County, Isfahan Province, Iran. At the 2006 census, its population was 608, in 165 families.

References 

Populated places in Tiran and Karvan County